Calicraft is an American craft beer brewery located in Walnut Creek, California.

History 
The company was founded in 2012 by Blaine Landberg, and opened its first taproom in 2016. Landberg first began brewing beer in college in his dorm room at UC Berkeley.

See also 

 List of breweries in California

References

External links 

 

2012 establishments in California
Beer brewing companies based in the San Francisco Bay Area
Companies based in Contra Costa County, California